Beau Wirick (born April 30, 1986) is an American actor known for playing the role of Sean Donahue on the sitcom The Middle. He has also appeared in guest roles on the TV series 7th Heaven, Arrested Development, NCIS, The Office, Drake & Josh and Jack & Bobby. He portrayed Julian Crane in a flashback sequence on the daytime drama Passions in 2004. In 2018, Wirick married his The Middle costar Daniela Bobadilla.

Filmography

Television

Web

References

External links
 

Living people
21st-century American male actors
Male actors from California
American male television actors
People from Fountain Valley, California
Place of birth missing (living people)
American male child actors
Actors from Orange County, California
1986 births